Plosorejo may refer to several villages in Indonesia, in the province of Central Java:

 Plosorejo, Blora, a village in the Blora Regency
 Plosorejo, Grobogan, a village in the Grobogan Regency
 Plosorejo, Pati, a village in the Pati Regency
 Plosorejo, Sragen, a village in the Sragen Regency